Rivaldo Antonio Correa Barbosa (born 7 September 1999) is a Colombian professional footballer who plays as a forward for Greek Super League 2 club Panserraikos.

References

1999 births
Living people
Colombian footballers
Categoría Primera A players
Categoría Primera B players
Águilas Doradas Rionegro players
Independiente Medellín footballers
Cortuluá footballers
Leones F.C. footballers
Panserraikos F.C. players
Association football forwards
People from Santa Marta
Sportspeople from Magdalena Department